The Clisto E.P. is the fourth EP by Thighpaulsandra released in 2007. The extended play dips into hard rock and noise rock across its four songs. It would be Thighpaulsandra's final release before an eight-year hiatus.

Track listing

Credits
Thighpaulsandra - synthesizers, vocals, autoharp, computer, farfisa organ
Siôn Orgon - vocals, percussion, drums, computer, twelve-string guitar, ARP 2600 synthesizer
Martin Schellard - electric guitar, bass
Chris Jones - vocals (on "Margaret")
Francis Naughton - backing vocals, guitar and Roland V-Synth (on "Margaret")

References

2007 EPs
Thighpaulsandra albums